Renommée was a 40-gun frigate of the French Navy.

Career 
Renommée entered service in 1767. In 1775, she underwent a refit.

In 1776, Renommée was commanded by Monteil, and part of the Escadre d'évolution under Du Chaffault. On 20 April 1776, she touched a reef while departing Brest. Du Chaffault defended Monteil, writing to the Navy Minister that "only those who command ships run the risk of losing them". Renommée was refloated a few days after, sent to a dry dock for repairs, and returned to service in June. 

Renommée was broken up in 1784.

Sources and references 
 Notes

Citations

References
 
 
 

1767 ships
Sailing frigates of the French Navy
Age of Sail frigates of France
Ships built in France